Misfire: Inside the Downfall of the NRA is a nonfiction book by NPR journalist Tim Mak, released Nov 2, 2021. It covers the NRA during the leadership of Wayne LaPierre. The author began writing about the NRA after observing the actions of the Russian agent Maria Butina.

Critical Reception 
Reviews have been positive. The New Republic called the book a "revealing and lively" look at a "gaudy saga." The Guardian says the book is a "bullseye" if "depressing" in some parts.

References 

2021 non-fiction books
National Rifle Association
Books about politics of the United States
E. P. Dutton books